Zero-G is the ability to achieve the sensation of weightlessness (for example to be falling freely in an atmosphere, or to be in zero-g). 

Zero-G or Zero G may refer to:

Companies
 Zero Gravity Corporation (operating as Zero-G), a U.S. flight adventure company that operates simulated zero-gravity flights
 Zero-G Ltd, a privately held U.K. company producing sample CDs
 Zero-G (studio), a Japanese animation studio
 ZeroG Wireless, a fabless semiconductor company

Literature
 Zero-G, a science fiction graphic novel authored by Alex Zamm
 Zero-G, a Marvel Comics character from Power Pack
 Beyblade: Zero-G, a Japanese manga comic book

Other uses
 ZER0-G, a Chinese music project; see List of Billboard China V Chart number-one videos of 2016
 S3 Zero G, a A300 aircraft used to perform zero-gravity flight by S3 (Swiss Space Systems)
 Zero-G, season 4 of Beyblade: Metal Fusion, a Japanese anime TV cartoon
 ICW Zero-G Championship, a British pro-wrestling championship

See also

G-Zero world, political science term referring to a leaderless world
Zero gravity (disambiguation)
G0 (disambiguation)
0G (disambiguation)
OG (disambiguation)
Gravity Zero (disambiguation)